There Was a Castle with Forty Dogs is a 1990 comedy film, starring Peter Ustinov and directed by Duccio Tessari. It is based on the novel Au bonheur des chiens by Rémo Forlani.

Cast 
 Peter Ustinov: the vet Muggione
 Delphine Forest: Violetta
 Roberto Alpi: Bob
 Mercedes Alonso: Giovanna
 Salvatore Cascio: Tom
 Jean-Claude Brialy: the judge
 José María Caffarel: the notary
 : Jolinka
 Nicola Pietrangeli: the President

References

External links

1990 films
1990 comedy films
Films directed by Duccio Tessari
Films scored by Detto Mariano
Films set in Tuscany
Films based on French novels
Films about dogs
Italian comedy films
1990s Italian-language films
1990s Italian films